This article lists the orders and deliveries for the Boeing 777. As of December 2022, the largest airline orders are by Emirates (255), Qatar Airways (159), and Singapore Airlines (116).

History
The title of largest 777 operator has changed hands during the aircraft's history. Singapore Airlines' order for up to 77 aircraft on November 15, 1995 constituted the largest-ever wide-body aircraft purchase at the time.  The purchase comprised 34 firm orders and 43 options for the 777-200ER, all to be powered Trent 800 series engines, and was valued at US$12.7 billion. The number of 777 customers had grown to 25 airlines by June 1997, with 323 aircraft on order. On August 26, 2004, Singapore Airlines followed up with a US$4 billion order for the 777-300ER, including 18 firm orders and 13 options. The combined orders would make the carrier's 777 fleet number 77 when deliveries were complete.

On November 20, 2005, Emirates placed the largest firm order for the 777. Totaling 42 aircraft, including 24 −300ERs, 10 −200LRs and 8 777Fs, the purchase was reportedly worth US$9.7 billion. The Middle Eastern carrier followed up with another order for 30 −300ERs at the 2010 Farnborough Airshow.

On September 19, 2013, Lufthansa confirmed a firm order of 20 777-9Xs prior to an official launch of the aircraft. Boeing launched the 777X at the 2013 Dubai Air Show. In March 2014, ANA of Japan ordered 20 777-9X models.

Orders and deliveries

Orders and deliveries by type and year

{| class="wikitable" style="margin:1em 1em 1em 300; border:1px #aaa solid; background:#fbf8db;"
|+ Boeing 777 orders and deliveries by type
|- style="font-weight:bold; background:#ccddff; padding:0.4em;"
|  ||Total orders||Total deliveries||Unfilled
|-
|777-200||88||88||–
|-
|777-200ER||422||422||–
|-
|777-200LR||61||61||–
|-
|777-300||60||60||–
|-
|777-300ER||838||832||6
|-
|777F||319||239||80
|-
|777X||353||–||353
|-
|Total||2,141||1,702||439
|-
|}
Orders and deliveries through February 2023

Orders through February 28, 2023 and deliveries

Boeing 777 orders and deliveries (cumulative, by year):

 

Orders and deliveries through February 28, 2023

Orders and deliveries sortable, presorted by customer

Data through February 28, 2023.

See also
List of Airbus A350 XWB orders and deliveries
List of Boeing 777 operators
List of Boeing 787 orders and deliveries

References

Orders
777